Dante Santos Gulapa (born January 20, 1980) is a Filipino internet and television personality known for his viral "macho dance" videos posted online on Facebook in 2019. He was nicknamed the "Big Papa" or "King Eagle" by his fan base "Gulapanatics" or "Daigonatics" for his signature dance move.

Personal life 

Gulapa was raised by his grandparents as a child.  When he was old enough, he visited night bars and started performing as a bar dancer. According to him, his struggle with financial issues pushed him to pursue erotic dancing.

He also took different jobs aside from being a performer. He earned the moniker "Master Daigo" from Lightning Legend: Daigo no Daibouken on PlayStation. The DJ at the bar where he worked dubbed him "Master Daigo" for his excellence at performing and showmanship.

Filmography

Television

References

External links 
 

Filipino male dancers
Filipino Internet celebrities
Living people
1980 births
People from Malabon